Alexander Yuryevich Enbert (born 17 April 1989) is a Russian retired pair skater. With Natalya Zabiyako, he was the 2019 World bronze medalist, 2018 European bronze medalist, 2018 Grand Prix of Helsinki champion, 2018 NHK Trophy champion, 2016 Rostelecom Cup silver medalist, and three-time Russian national medalist.

From 2010 to 2014, he competed with Katarina Gerboldt. The pair placed fourth at the 2011 European Championships.

Personal life 
On 29 February 2020 three days after the retirement he married his longtime girlfriend Alesya Danchyuk in Saint Petersburg.

Early career
Early in his career, Enbert skated with Viktoria Kazantseva. The pair placed 12th at the 2006 World Junior Championships.

In 2007, Enbert began a partnership with Ksenia Ozerova, coached by Oksana Kazakova. During the 2008–09 season, they won silver and bronze medals on the Junior Grand Prix series. This qualified them for the Junior Grand Prix Final, however, they withdrew after the short program. They made their senior international debut at the 2008 Cup of Russia, where they placed 5th. They were given a berth to the 2009 World Championships after Lubov Iliushechkina / Nodari Maisuradze withdrew due to injury. They finished 24th at the event.

The following season, Ozerova/Enbert won silver at the 2009 Cup of Nice, finished 8th at the 2009 Skate Canada International and 6th at Russian senior nationals. They split up at the end of the season.

Partnership with Gerboldt

Enbert's coaches suggested that he try out with single skater Katarina Gerboldt, whom he knew since childhood. In March 2010, it was announced that he and Gerboldt had formed a partnership. They were originally coached by Tamara Moskvina and Artur Dmitriev at Yubileyny Sports Palace in Saint Petersburg.

During the 2010–11 season, Gerboldt/Enbert made their international debut at the 2010 Cup of Nice, which they won. They finished fourth at the 2010 Cup of Russia, their sole Grand Prix event of the season. At the 2011 Russian Nationals, they placed fourth in the short program and fifth in the long, to finish fourth overall. As Tatiana Volosozhar / Maxim Trankov were ineligible to compete at the 2011 European Championships, Gerboldt/Enbert were named in the team for the event. They placed fifth in the short program with a new personal best score of 57.50, fourth in the free program, also with a new personal best (112.45), and finished fourth overall with 169.95 points, their best combined total.

In the 2011–12 season, Gerboldt/Enbert competed in one Grand Prix event, the 2011 Cup of Russia. In 2012–13, they were assigned to Skate Canada but withdrew due to injury – Gerboldt tore a ligament. Coached by Oleg Vasiliev, Gerboldt/Enbert returned to competition in the 2013–14 season but split in April 2014.

Partnership with Davankova
On 30 April 2014, Nina Mozer announced that Enbert and Vasilisa Davankova had formed a partnership, coached by her in Moscow. Davankova said they would begin training on 12 May. The pair performed an exhibition a few weeks later at a charity gala in Luzhniki.

Partnership with Zabiyako

2015–16 season
In July 2015, the Russian media reported that Enbert had teamed up with Natalya Zabiyako and that she had been released to represent Russia internationally.

Zabijako/Enbert's international debut came in October 2015 at the 2015 Mordovian Ornament, a Challenger Series (CS) event at which they won a silver medal. In November, the pair appeared for the first time on the Grand Prix series, placing fifth at the 2015 Rostelecom Cup. In early December, they finished fourth at the 2015 CS Golden Spin of Zagreb and third in the CS standings. At the 2016 Russian Championships, the pair placed fifth in both segments and overall.

2016–17 season
Zabijako/Enbert started the 2016–17 season on the Challenger Series, obtaining the bronze medal at the 2016 CS Ondrej Nepela Memorial. Turning to the Grand Prix series, the pair won the silver medal at the 2016 Rostelecom Cup, having placed first in the short and second in the free behind Germany's Aliona Savchenko / Bruno Massot. They then placed fourth at the 2016 Trophée de France. These results didn't qualify them to the 2016–17 Grand Prix Final but they were the 1st alternates and were called up after Aliona Savchenko / Bruno Massot withdrew. Zabijako/Enbert placed fourth at the 2016–17 Grand Prix Final after placing fifth in both the short program and the free skate.

In December 2016 Zabijako/Enbert won the bronze medal at the 2017 Russian Championships after placing third in both the short program and the free skate. In January 2017 they competed at the 2017 European Championships where finished fifth after placing fifth in both the short program and the free skate. In March 2017 Zabijako/Enbert finished twelfth at the 2017 World Championships.

2017–18 season
Zabijako/Enbert began their season on the Challenger Series, winning a gold medal at both the 2017 CS Lombardia Trophy and 2017 CS Ondrej Nepela Trophy.

In their first Grand Prix event of the season, Zabijako/Enbert placed fourth at 2017 Skate Canada after placing fourth in both the short program and free skate. In their second Grand Prix event at 2017 Skate America, Zabijako/Enbert placed fourth after ranking fourth  in the short program and fifth in the free skate. The pair did not quality for the 2017-18 Grand Prix Final.

In December 2017 Zabijako/Enbert won their 3rd 2017–18 Challenger Series gold medal when they won the 2017 CS Golden Spin of Zagreb. A few weeks later they placed third at the 2018 Russian Championships, earning places on the Russian national team for the 2018 Winter Olympics.

In January 2018 they won the bronze medal at the 2018 European Championships after placing second in the short program and third in the free skate.

At the Winter Olympics in Pyeongchang, South Korea, Zabiyako/Enbert placed third in the free skate portion of the team event, earning a silver medal as part of the Russian team.  They then placed seventh at the pairs event with a personal best score of 212.88 points.

In March 2018 Zabijako/Enbert finished fourth at the 2018 World Championships after placing fourth in the short program and sixth in the free skate.

2018–19 season
Zabijako/Enbert started their season in mid September at the 2018 CS Lombardia Trophy where they won the gold medal ahead of their teammates Aleksandra Boikova / Dmitrii Kozlovskii.

In early November Zabijako/Enbert won their first Grand Prix gold medal at the 2018 Grand Prix of Helsinki. They ranked second in the short program and first in the free skate and beat the silver medalists, Nicole Della Monica / Matteo Guarise, by about 13 points.  Zabiyako described their first Grand Prix victory as "a good experience for us." Only one week later Zabijako/Enbert won their second Grand Prix gold medal at the 2018 NHK Trophy with a personal best score of 214.14 points. They ranked first in both programs and beat the silver medalist, Peng Cheng / Jin Yang, by about 7 points.

With two Grand Prix gold medals they qualified for the 2018–19 Grand Prix Final.  In second after the short program, an underrotated side-by-side jump from Zabiyako followed by an aborted lift toward the end of their program dropped them to fourth in the free skate and fourth overall.  Zabiyako remarked that "probably some parts of our program were not quite ready yet, but we will improve them."  At the 2019 Russian Championships, Zabiyako/Enbert won the silver medal, placing second in both the short and free programs.  Enbert said "we’re pleased with what we showed in the free skating. We fixed some issues from the Final and skated at a higher level here in Saransk."

Zabiyako/Enbert were named to Russia's team for the 2019 European Championships, but withdrew on December 27, 2018 due to medical issues.  They were replaced by Daria Pavliuchenko / Denis Khodykin.

One week prior to the 2019 World Championships, the skaters were declared fit to compete, and they won their first World medal—a bronze.  They concluded their season at the 2019 World Team Trophy as part of Team Russia, where they won the bronze medal.

Retirement
Zabiiako/Enbert did not compete during the 2019–20 figure skating season due to Enbert's illness.  On February 26, 2020, it was announced that while Enbert was healthy again, they would not be returning to competition. 
In the same year a documentary film "Unbroken" was released about the couples A.Cain-Gribble / T.LeDuc (USA) and N.Zabiiako / A.Enbert (Russia).

Programs

With Zabiyako

With Davankova

With Gerboldt

Earlier partnerships
with Ozerova

with Kazantseva

Records and achievements 
(with Zabiiako)

 Set the pairs' world record of the new +5 / -5 GOE (Grade of Execution) system for the short program (72.50 points) at the 2018 CS Lombardia Trophy.

Competitive highlights
GP: Grand Prix; CS: Challenger Series; JGP: Junior Grand Prix

With Zabiiako

With Davankova

With Gerboldt

With Ozerova

With Kazantseva

Detailed results
Small medals for short and free programs awarded only at ISU Championships. At team events, medals awarded for team results only.

With Zabiyako

References

External links

! colspan="3" style="border-top: 5px solid #78FF78;" |World Record Holders

Russian male pair skaters
World Figure Skating Championships medalists
European Figure Skating Championships medalists
1989 births
Living people
Russian people of German descent
Figure skaters from Saint Petersburg
Universiade medalists in figure skating
Figure skaters at the 2018 Winter Olympics
Olympic figure skaters of Russia
Medalists at the 2018 Winter Olympics
Olympic medalists in figure skating
Olympic silver medalists for Olympic Athletes from Russia
Universiade silver medalists for Russia
Competitors at the 2009 Winter Universiade